Pujya Tan Singh Ji was born in a Mahecha Rathore rajput family of barmer on 25 January 1924. was an Indian politician and a member of the Lok Sabha twice. He founded Shri Kshatriya Yuvak Sangh, an organisation for young Rajputs. Previously he was a Member of the Legislative Assembly of Rajasthan state.

Early life

Tan Singh ji was born on 25 January 1924 in Nanihal Bairsiala (Jaisalmer). Taneraj was his childhood name. His father's name was Thakur Balwant Singh Mehecha and his mother's name was Mrs. Moti Kanwar Sodha. His father died only 4 years after his birth.

Studies

Tansingh started his early studies in Barmer. After studying in Barmer till the sixth grade, in the year 1938, at the age of only 14, he took admission in Chaupasni Vidyalaya, Jodhpur. Studied up to matriculation in Chaupasni.

About 600 km from his home in the year 1942. He did his graduation from Birla College, located in Pilani town of Jhunjhunu district. In 1946, he obtained the degree of law from Nagpur.

Political Career
After becoming a lawyer, Tan Singh came to Barmer again and he started advocating here. In the year 1949, he was appointed as the first chairman of Barmer Municipality. In the 1952 elections, Tan Singh was elected to the first Legislative Assembly of Rajasthan from Barmer. At that time he was only 28 years old.

He was re-elected as an MLA in the year 1957. In 1962, Barmer got only Rs 9000 from Jaisalmer’s largest constituency. MPs were elected by spending. Lost the 1967 election, then started his own business and also provided employment to many of his colleagues. Re-elected MP in the year 1977.

Tan Singh also joined the movement against the ban on Rashtriya Swayamsevak Sangh after Gandhiji’s assassination in the year 1948 and also got voluntary arrest.

Social work

Tansingh ji became very sensitive about the condition and direction of the society. Seeing the deteriorating direction of the society, he became very worried and he collected such people who want to work for the society. On the night of Diwali of 1944, he laid the foundation of an organization called Shri Kshatriya Yuvak Sangh, which became a milestone for Rajput society.

Many social evils were removed by this institution in the Rajput society. During his lifetime, he conducted 192 camps of the Sangh. From 23 December 1978 to 1 January 1979, the seven-day training camp at Ratangarh was Tansinghji’s last camp.

Death

He died on 7 December 1979. He was 55 years old at the time of his death.

References

Rajasthani politicians
1924 births
1979 deaths
India MPs 1962–1967
India MPs 1977–1979
Lok Sabha members from Rajasthan
People from Barmer, Rajasthan
Akhil Bharatiya Ram Rajya Parishad politicians
Janata Party politicians
Swatantra Party politicians
Rajasthan MLAs 1952–1957
Rajasthan MLAs 1957–1962
Rajasthan MLAs 1962–1967